The  was a field army of the Imperial Japanese Army during World War II, based in northern Manchukuo and active in combat against the Soviet Union in the closing stages of the war.

History
The Japanese 1st Area Army was formed on July 4, 1942 under the control of the Kwantung Army as a military reserve and garrison force to maintain security and public order in northern Manchukuo as many veteran divisions of the Kwangtung Army were transferred to the various southern fronts in the Pacific War. It consisted mostly of minimally-trained reservists, conscripted students and home guard militia, without adequate weapons or supplies. The 1st Area Army was headquartered in Dunhua, in what is now the Yanbian Korean Autonomous Prefecture of Jilin Province, China.

The units of the 1st Area Army proved to be no match for the Red Army when the Soviet Union invaded Manchukuo at the end of World War II. Without adequate armor, ammunition or leadership, many units broke and fled, or surrendered en masse. Many surviving soldiers of the 1st Area Army, including its commanding officer General Seiichi Kita, became prisoners in Siberia and other parts of the Soviet Union after the surrender of Japan on August 15, 1945.

List of Commanders

Commanding officer

Chief of Staff

References

Books

External links

Notes 

1
Military units and formations established in 1942
Military units and formations disestablished in 1945